Bruno Leo Zulma Nachtergaele (24 June 1962 in Oudenaarde) is a Belgian mathematical physicist.

Nachtergaele studied physics with a licentiate degree in 1984 from the Katholieke Universiteit Leuven. There he was awarded in 1987 a doctorate in theoretical physics under André Verbeure with dissertation Exacte resultaten voor het spin-Boson model (Exact results for the spin boson model), written in Dutch. From 1989 to 1990 Nachtergaele was an instructor at the University of Chile. At Princeton University, where he worked with Elliott Lieb, Nachtergaele was from 1991 to 1993 an instructor and from 1993 to 1996 an assistant professor of physics. At the University of California, Davis he was from 1996 to 2000 an associate professor and is since 2000 a full professor of mathematics. From 2007 to 2010 he was the chair of the Mathematics Department of the University of California, Davis.

His research concerns the mathematical physics of equilibrium and nonequilibrium statistical mechanics, quantum spin systems, and quantum information.

He was elected in 2012 a Fellow of the American Mathematical Society and in 2007 a Fellow of the American Association for the Advancement of Science. In 2002 in Beijing he was an Invited Speaker, with Horng-Tzer Yau, at the International Congress of Mathematicians with talk Derivation of the Euler equations from many-body quantum mechanics.

He was co-editor of 2 volumes of selecta of Elliott Lieb.

Selected publications
 with John Hunter: Applied Analysis, World Scientific 2001
 with Mark Fannes & André Verbeure: The equilibrium states of the spin-boson model, Comm. Math. Phys., 114, 1988, 537–548, 1988, Project Euclid
 with Mark Fannes & Reinhard Werner: Finitely Correlated States on Quantum Spin Chains, Comm. Math. Phys. 144, 1992, 443–490, Project Euclid
 with Michael Aizenman: Geometric Aspects of Quantum Spin States, Commun. Math. Phys., 164, 1994, 17–63, Arxiv
 with Elliott Lieb: The Stability of the Peierls Instability for Ring-Shaped Molecules, Phys. Rev. B, 51, 1995, 4777–4791, Arxiv
 with Horng-Tzer Yau:  Derivation of the Euler Equations from Quantum Dynamics , Commun. Math. Phys., 243, 2003, 485–540, Arxiv
 wit Robert Sims:  Recent progress in quantum spin systems , in J.T. Lewis  Markov Processes and related fields  2007
 Quantum Spin Systems, Encyclopedia of Mathematical Physics, Elsevier 2006, Arxiv

References

External links
 Homepage
 Additional Website at UC Davis
 

20th-century Belgian mathematicians
21st-century Belgian mathematicians
Mathematical physicists
KU Leuven alumni
University of California, Davis faculty
Fellows of the American Mathematical Society
Fellows of the American Association for the Advancement of Science
People from Oudenaarde
1962 births
Living people
Presidents of the International Association of Mathematical Physics